Hubert John Collar, CBE (18 January 1900 – 24 July 1985) was a British businessman in China and Hong Kong. He was the Hong Kong manager of the Imperial Chemical Industries and member of the Legislative Council of Hong Kong.

Collar married Amy Frances "Bunty" Richardson, daughter of Dr. Alan Richardson, in Holy Trinity Cathedral, Shanghai in December 1924. During the Japanese occupation of Hong Kong, he was interned and served as a camp representative.

He was the Hong Kong manager of the Imperial Chemical Industries. In 1952, he was chairman of the Hong Kong General Chamber of Commerce. He was also leading member of the China Association, a London-based group representing the interests of traders in China. In 1953, he was appointed to the Legislative Council of Hong Kong as the representative of the chamber of commerce.

Collar was appointed a Commander of the Order of the British Empire (CBE) in the 1947 Birthday Honours.

References

1900 births
1985 deaths
20th-century British businesspeople
British expatriates in China
British expatriates in Hong Kong
Hong Kong bankers
Members of the Legislative Council of Hong Kong
Commanders of the Order of the British Empire
Imperial Chemical Industries executives
People from Whitstable